Exodus or the Exodus may refer to:

Religion 
 Book of Exodus, second book of the Hebrew Torah and the Christian Bible
 The Exodus, the biblical story of the migration of the ancient Israelites from Egypt into Canaan

Historical events 

 Exodus of 1879 (The Kansas Exodus), in which black Americans known as Exodusters fled the Southern United States for Kansas

 The Exodus (1940), in Belgium and France
 1948 Palestinian exodus
 1948 Palestinian exodus from Lydda and Ramle
 1949–1956 Palestinian exodus
 1967 Palestinian exodus
 2021 Kabul airlift
 Cuban exodus
 Exodus of Kashmiri Hindus wherein ethnic Kashmiri Hindus were expelled from the Kashmir Valley, threatened with rape, death and conversion to Islam if they chose otherwise.
 Exodus of Slav-Macedonians from Greece, the exodus of ethnic Macedonians following the Greek Civil War
 Istrian-Dalmatian exodus, the exodus of Italians from Istria, Fiume and Dalmatia after World War II
 Jewish exodus from Muslim countries, the twentieth century emigration, expulsion or escape of Jews, in which Jewish populations moved to Palestine
 Jujuy Exodus, the massive evacuation of people from the province of Jujuy, Argentina, in 1812, during the Argentine War of Independence
 Northern Cheyenne Exodus, attempt of the Northern Cheyenne to return to the north
 Operation Exodus (WWII operation), an Allied operation to repatriate European prisoners of war to Britain in the Second World War
 Palestinian exodus from Kuwait (1990–91)
 , a ship carrying thousands of Jewish refugees in 1947 that was refused entry into  British Mandatory Palestine

Arts and media

Literature 
Exodus (poem), an Old English retelling of the Biblical departure
Exodus (Uris novel), a 1958 novel by Leon Uris, based partly on the story of the Jewish refugee ship by that name
Exodus (Bertagna novel), a 2002 science fiction novel by Julie Bertagna
Exodus (Starfire), a science fiction novel by Steve White and Shirley Meier
:Z213: Exit, a 2009 fictional diary by Dimitris Lyacos based on the biblical Exodus
Transformers: Exodus by Alexander C. Irvine
Exodus: How Migration is Changing Our World (UK title: Exodus: Immigration and Multiculturalism in the 21st Century), a book by development economist Paul Collier about the impact of migration on global development
Exodus, a 2013 novel by Lars Iyer

Film 
Exodus (1960 film), a film by Otto Preminger based on the novel by Leon Uris
Exodus (2007 British film), a contemporary retelling of the Biblical story of Exodus
Exodus (2007 Hong Kong film), a film directed by Pang Ho-Cheung
Exodus: Tales from the Enchanted Kingdom, a 2005 Filipino film
Exodus: Gods and Kings (2014), a Ridley Scott movie about Moses
Exodus (2015 film), a Georgian film
Exodus (2020 film), an Iranian film directed by Ebrahim Hatamikia

Gaming
Exodus (role-playing game), a post-apocalyptic role-playing game by Glutton Creeper Games
Exodus (video game), a 1991 video game developed by Color Dreams centering on Moses' journey to The Promised Land
Exodus (Magic: The Gathering), an expansion to the Magic: The Gathering collectible card game from the Rath block
Oddworld: Abe's Exoddus, a 1998 video game
Ground Control II: Operation Exodus, a 2004 real-time tactical game in the Ground Control series
Ultima III: Exodus, a 1983 computer role-playing game in the Ultima series
Metro Exodus, the third instalment in a post-apocalyptic first person shooter series

Music 
Exodus, a 1981 symphonic poem by Polish composer Wojciech Kilar

Bands and labels 
Exodus (American band), thrash metal band from California
Exodus (Icelandic band), jazz fusion band formed by Björk
Exodus (Polish band), Polish symphonic rock band
Exodus (musician) (born 1984), Ugandan singer
Exodus Records, semi-independent label started in 1966

Albums 
Exodus (soundtrack), a 1961 soundtrack album by Ernest Gold from the 1960 film
Exodus (Slide Hampton album), 1964 album by jazz trombonist Slide Hampton
Exodus (Bob Marley & The Wailers album), a 1977 studio album by Bob Marley & The Wailers
Exodus (The New Power Generation album), 1995 album by the New Power Generation
Exodus (Samael album), 1998 EP by Samael
Exodus (compilation album), 1998 album featuring various Christian artists
Exodus (Andy Hunter album), a 2002 studio album by DJ Andy Hunter
The Exodus (album), a 2002 album by Gospel Gangstaz
Exodus (Plus One album), the (2003) final album by Christian rock band Plus One
Exodus (Hikaru Utada album), 2004 album by Hikaru Utada, under the stage-name Utada
Exodus (Ja Rule album), 2005 greatest-hits album by Ja Rule
Exodus (Exo album), 2015 studio album by South Korean-Chinese boyband EXO
Exodus (DMX album), 2021 posthumous album by DMX

Songs 
"Exodus", a 1964 single by The Tornados
"Exodus" (Bob Marley & The Wailers song), from the album of the same name
"Exodus", by Fates Warning, from the 1986 album Awaken the Guardian
"Exodus '04", a 2005 single by Hikaru Utada
"Theme of Exodus", by Ernest Gold from the film Exodus, later a hit for Ferrante & Teicher
"The Exodus Song", by Booker T & The MGs from the 1968 album Doin' Our Thing
"Exodus", 2007 track by Noisia featuring KRS-One
"Exodus", original name of the song "Emigre" by Anti-Flag from the album For Blood and Empire
"Exodus", by Evanescence from the 1998 Evanescence EP
"Exodus: origins", a 2009 single by Weesp
"Exodus 23:1", 2012 single by Pusha T featuring The-Dream
"Exodus", by Blessthefall from the 2013 album Hollow Bodies
"Exodus", by M.I.A. from the 2013 album Matangi
"Exodus", by South Korean-Chinese boyband Exo from the album of the same name
"Exodus", a 2018 single by Pink Martini featuring Jimmie Herrod

Television 
"Exodus" (Battlestar Galactica), a 2006 two part episode of Battlestar Galactica
"Exodus" (Entourage), an episode of Entourage
"Exodus" (Lost), a 2005 three-part episode of Lost
"The Exodus" (Sliders), a two-part episode from season three of Sliders
"Exodus" (Smallville), an episode of Smallville
"Exodus" (Stargate SG-1), a 2000 episode of Stargate SG-1
"Exodus" (Supergirl), an episode of Supergirl
"Exodus", an episode from season four of ER
Exodus, the original subtitle of the third volume of Heroes
"Exodus", episode 10 in the Discovery channel reality series The Colony
"Exodus", episode 42 in the anime television series Bakugan Battle Brawlers: New Vestroia
"Exodus", the pilot episode of the 1985–89 animated series  ThunderCats

Other uses in media and entertainment
Exodus (comics), a Marvel Comics character and former leader of the Acolytes
Exodus Viewer, a third party viewer for Second Life
Exodus (custom car), a car built by Bill Cushenbery

Organizations 
EXODUS (NGO), an organization to bring international fugitive Jung Myung Seok to justice
Exodus (transitional housing), an international organization providing housing and job training for ex-offenders
Exodus Communications, a defunct internet hosting company
Exodus International, a now defunct ex-gay organization

Sociology 
Rural exodus, the migratory patterns that normally occur in a region following the mechanization of agriculture
Emigration, the action and the phenomenon of leaving one's native country to settle abroad intentionally
Forced displacement, the act of being forced to leave one's home or native country to be settled abroad

Other uses 
 "Exodus", a disc golf fairway driver by Infinite Discs

See also 
 Christian pacifism
 Diaspora (disambiguation)
 Exodus Collective
 Exodus Refugee Immigration
 Human migration
 Muhajir (disambiguation)
 The Exodus Decoded